Pleasance Islington (also known as Pleasance London or the Pleasance Theatre) is a fringe theatre in Islington, London, opened in 1995. It is run by the Pleasance Theatre Trust and is the sister venue of the original Pleasance Edinburgh.

It has hosted popular comedians including Michael McIntyre, Russell Brand, Micky Flanagan, Mark Watson, Adam Hills and Mark Thomas.

References

Theatres in the London Borough of Islington
Buildings and structures in Islington